The name Christian Ludwig may refer to:

Christian Ludwig of Brandenburg-Schwedt (1677–1734), recipient of Bach's Brandenburg Concertos
Christian Ludwig II, Duke of Mecklenburg-Schwerin (1683–1756)
Christian Ludwig Ideler (1766–1846), astronomer
Christian Ludwig Nitzsch (1782–1837), zoologist
Christian Ludwig Brehm (1787–1864), pastor
Duke Christian Louis of Mecklenburg-Schwerin (1912–1996)
Christian Ludwig (physicist) (1749–1784), German physician and physicist
Christian Friedrich Ludwig (1757–1823), German physician and naturalist
Christian Gottlieb Ludwig (1709–1773), German physician and botanist

See also
Christian Louis (disambiguation)